Nightrider (Dagon) is a fictional vampire superhero from the DC Comics universe. He is a member of the Team Titans, a rebel group seeking to overthrow Lord Chaos, the dictator of an alternate Earth ten years into the future.

Fictional character biography
David was an ordinary mortal boy growing up in London. When he was ten, he was hit by a truck. Lord Chaos took a special interest in him, making him a test subject. 

At fourteen, he was the subject of an experiment in which he was infused with DNA drawn from the bones of Dracula. This turned him into a blood-hungering monster he dubbed "Dagon", because he felt as if David, the person he used to be, was dead. During the experiment, a demon attacked the research team; Dagon joined it and singled out the chief researcher for special attention. The only survivor was Charlie Watkins, who would later become the hero Killowat.

Dagon joined the Team Titans to get revenge on Lord Chaos, adopting the name Nightrider. They taught him how to control his hunger and assigned him to a team. 

Nightrider and his teammates Killowat (Charlie Watkins), Terra (Tara Markov), Mirage (Miriam Delgado), and Redwing (Carrie Levine) were selected by the leader of Team Titans to be sent back in time. They were later followed by Nightwing (Dick Grayson) and Battalion (Alexander Lyons). Their mission was to kill Wonder Girl (Donna Troy) before she could give birth to Lord Chaos. 

The Teamers and the Titans fought, but they resolved the conflict in a way that stopped Lord Chaos and protected Donna Troy and her baby. This left the Teamers trapped in the present with no way to return to their now non-existent future. 

Dagon later sought out his past self and prevented David from being hit by the truck.

Zero Hour
The paradox induced by their travel to the past was apparently part of the time crisis known as Zero Hour. The real tyrant, the Monarch, had created the members of Team Titans 36 years in the future in 2030 AD. The Monarch then brainwashed them with false memories. He then sent them to the past so he could use them to further his goals and assassinate anyone who tried to stop him. 

After the resolution of Zero Hour, most of the Team Titans characters ceased to exist. Only Terra, Mirage and Deathwing survived. The Time Trapper had created them to infiltrate Team Titans as his sleeper agents that would help him fight the Monarch when the time came. Later it was revealed that they were doubles who were surgically altered to resemble the real Tara Markov, Miriam Delgado, and Dick Grayson.

Other versions
 In Team Titans Annual #2 (1994), Dagon works with Terra as a rebel cell in deep space after Lord Chaos conquers much of the galaxy.
 In the story "Wrong Place, Wrong Time" in Teen Titans Go! #48 (December 2007), the alternate-world-hopping Teen Titans encounter the Team Titans, which are led by "Nightwing" (Dagon).

References

External links

Comics characters introduced in 1991
Characters created by Marv Wolfman